Dunglen is an unincorporated community in Jefferson County, in the U.S. state of Ohio.

History
A post office called Dunglen was established in 1903. Dunglen was originally a mining community.

References

Unincorporated communities in Jefferson County, Ohio
Unincorporated communities in Ohio